Paralaxita telesia, the common red harlequin, is a species in the butterfly family Riodinidae.

Subspecies
P. t. lyclene (de Nicéville, 1894) - Peninsular Malaya, southern Thailand
P. t. boulleti (Fruhstorfer, [1914]) – Thailand
P. t. lychnitis (Fruhstorfer, 1904) - north-eastern Sumatra
P. t. pistyrus (Fruhstorfer, 1914) south-eastern Borneo

Description
In males both wings are mainly dark brown, with a crimson apex and a whitish large spot on the forewings. Underside is carmine with bands and spots of blue and black. The apex of the forewings is rufous. Hindwings are crossed near the outer margin by a band of light blue and a band of light yellow, each bordered with black.

Distribution
This species can be found in the Peninsular Malaya, Laos, Vietnam, Thailand, Borneo and Sumatra.

Gallery

References

External links

 Samui Butterflies
 Yutaka

Riodinidae
Butterflies of Indochina
Butterflies described in 1861
Taxa named by William Chapman Hewitson